Below is a selected list of camellia cultivars which currently (2016)
hold the Royal Horticultural Society's Award of Garden Merit. Camellias are popular shrubs of medium to large size (typically 1 to 4 cubic metres), originating in China and the far east. Best seen in a dappled woodland setting, they thrive in acid soil, like other calcifuges such as rhododendrons. They are especially valued for their glossy evergreen foliage and large showy blooms, in shades of red, pink and white. These can appear as early as November in favoured locations in the temperate Northern Hemisphere; but the main flowering season is early to mid spring (February to May). Though the plants are robust, the blooms are easily damaged by frost. It is therefore advisable to site the plants away from direct morning sun.

Maximum dimensions are shown in metres, after 10–20 years.

{| class="wikitable sortable"
|-
! name !! species !! colour !! form || height  (m) !! spread (m)  !! ref !! image
|-
| Adelina Patti || japonica || pink || single || 2.5 || 2.5 ||  ||
|-
| Adolphe Audusson || japonica || red || single || 8 || 8 ||  ||
|-
| Akashigata || japonica || rose-pink || semi-double || 2.5 || 2.5 ||  ||
|-
| Alba Plena || japonica || white || double || 8 || 8 ||  || 
|-
| Alexander Hunter || japonica || red || single || 4 || 4 ||  ||
|-
| Annie Wylam || japonica || pink (pale) || double || 4 || 2.5 ||  ||
|-
| Anticipation || × williamsii || rose-pink || double || 4 || 2.5 ||  || 
|-
| Australis || japonica || rose pink || single || 4 || 2.5 ||  ||
|-
| Ballet Dancer || japonica || pale pink/cream || double || 4 || 2.5 ||  ||
|-
| Berenice Boddy || japonica || pale pink || semi-double || 4 || 2.5 ||  ||
|-
| Black Lace || japonica × williamsii || red || double || 2.5 || 2.5 ||  || 
|-
| Bob Hope || japonica || red || semi-double || 4 || 2.5 ||  || 
|-
| Bob's Tinsie || japonica || red || double || 2.5 || 1 ||  || 
|-
| Bowen Bryant || × williamsii || pink || semi-double || 4 || 4 ||  || 
|-
| Brigadoon || × williamsii || rose-pink || semi-double || 4 || 2.5 ||  || 
|-
| Bokuhan || japonica || red || single || 1 || 1 ||  || 
|-
| C.M. Hovey || japonica || rose-pink || double || 4 || 2.5 ||  ||
|-
| Carter's Sunburst || japonica || pale pink || double || 4 || 2.5 || <ref>{{cite web
|url=https://www.rhs.org.uk/Plants/69054/i-Camellia-japonica-i-Carter-s-Sunburst/Details
|title=Camellia japonica 'Carter's Sunburst|publisher=RHS
|accessdate=27 April 2016}}</ref> ||
|-
| China Clay || × williamsii || white || semi-double || 2.5 || 2.5 ||  || 
|-
| Commander Mulroy || japonica || white || double || 2.5 || 1.5 ||  ||
|-
| Cornish Snow || cuspidata × saluenensis || white || single || 2.5 || 1.5 ||  || 
|-
| Cornish Spring || cuspidata × japonica || pink || single || 2.5 || 1.5 ||  || 
|-
| Crimson King || sasanqua || rose-red || single || 2.5 || 2.5 ||  || 
|-
| Daintiness || × williamsii || salmon pink || semi-double || 4 || 2.5 ||  || 
|-
| Debbie || × williamsii || rose-pink || double || 4 || 4 ||  || 
|-
| Desire || japonica || white/pink || double || 4 || 2.5 ||  || 
|-
| Doctor Clifford Parks || japonica × reticulata || pink || double || 8 || 4 ||  || 
|-
| Doctor Tinsley || japonica || pale pink  || semi-double  || 2.5  || 2.5 ||  || 
|-
| Donation || × williamsii || pale pink || semi-double || 8 || 8 ||  || 
|-
| Drama Girl || japonica || rose-pink  || semi-double || 4  || 2.5  ||  || 
|-
| E.T.R. Carlyon || × williamsii || white || semi-double || 4 || 2.5 ||  || 
|-
| Elegant Beauty || × williamsii || rose-pink || semi-double || 4 || 2.5 ||  || 
|-
| Elsie Jury || × williamsii || rose-pink || double || 4 || 2.5 ||  || 
|-
| Francie L. || reticulata || pink || semi-double || 4 || 4 ||  || 
|-
| Freedom Bell || × williamsii || red || semi-double || 2.5 || 2.5 ||  || 
|-
| George Blandford || × williamsii || deep pink || double || 4 || 4 ||  || 
|-
| Glenn's Orbit || × williamsii || deep pink || semi-double || 4 || 4 ||  || 
|-
|  Gloire de Nantes || japonica || rose-pink || semi-double  || 2.5 || 2.5 ||  || 
|-
| Grand Prix  || japonica || red || semi-double || 8 || 8 ||  || 
|-
| Grand Slam || japonica || red (deep) || double || 4  || 4 ||  || 
|-
| Guilio Nuccio || japonica || rose-pink || double || 4 || 2.5 ||  || 
|-
| Hagoromo || japonica || pale pink || semi-double || 4 || 2.5 ||  || 
|-
| Hakurakuten || japonica || white || semi-double || 4 || 2.5 ||  || 
|-
| Hugh Evans || sasanqua || rose-pink || single || 4 || 2.5 ||  || 
|-
| Inspiration || reticulata × saluenensis || rose pink || semi-double || 4 || 2.5 ||  ||
|-
| J.C. Williams || × williamsii || pink || single || 4 || 4 ||  || 
|-
| Jean May || sasanqua || pale pink || semi-double || 2.5 || 2.5 ||  || 
|-
| Joseph Pfingstl || japonica || red (deep) || semi-double || 4 || 4 ||  || 
|-
| Julia Hamiter || × williamsii || pale pink/white || double || 4 || 4 ||  || 
|-
| Jupiter || japonica || rose-red || single || 4 || 2.5 ||  || 
|-
| Jury's Yellow || × williamsii || white/yellow || semi-double || 4 || 4 ||  || 
|-
| Konronkoku || japonica || red (deep) || double || 2.5 || 2.5 ||  || 
|-
| Lavinia Maggi || japonica || white/pink || double || 4 || 4 ||  || 
|-
| Leonard Messel || reticulata  x (x williamsii) || rose-pink || semi-double || 4 || 4 ||  || 
|-
| Les Jury || × williamsii || red || double || 2.5 || 1.5 ||  || 
|-
| Mars || japonica || red (deep) || semi-double || 4 || 4 ||  || 
|-
| Masayoshi || japonica || red/white || semi-double || 4 || 4 ||  || 
|-
| Mercury || japonica || red (deep) || semi-double || 2.5 || 2.5 ||  || 
|-
| Muskoka || × williamsii || deep pink || semi-double || 4 || 4 ||  || 
|-
| Narumigata || sasanqua || white || single || 4 || 2.5 ||  || 
|-
| Nobilissima || japonica || white || double || 4 || 4 ||  || 
|-
| Nuccio's Gem || japonica || white || double || 4 || 4 ||  || 
|-
| Nuccio's Jewel || japonica || pink/white || double || 4 || 2.5 ||  || 
|-
| R.L. Wheeler || style="width: 100px;" | japonica || rose-pink || semi-double || 4 || 2.5 ||  || 
|-
| Royalty || japonica × reticulata || red || semi-double || 1 || 1 ||  || 
|-
| Saint Ewe || × williamsii || rose-pink || single || 4 || 4 ||  || 
|-
| San Dimas || japonica || red (deep) || single || 4 || 2.5 ||  || 
|-
| Senorita || × williamsii || pink || double || 2.5 || 2.5 ||  || 
|-
| Show Girl || reticulata × sasanqua || pale pink || semi-double || 4 || 2.5 ||  || 
|-
| Sparkling Burgundy || || pink || double || 4 || 2.5 ||  || 
|-
| Spring Festival || cuspidata hybrid || pale pink || double || 4 || 2.5 ||  || 
|-
| Tom Knudsen || japonica × reticulata || red (deep) || double  || 2.5 || 2.5 ||  || 
|-
| Sylva || japonica || red (deep) || single || 4 || 2.5 ||  || 
|-
| Tricolor || japonica || white/red || semi-double || 4 || 4 ||  || 
|-
| Water Lily || × williamsii || pink || double || 4 || 2.5 ||  || 
|-
|}

See also
 Camellia
 Camellia japonica Camellia reticulata Camellia sasanqua''
 Camellia × williamsii

References

Camellia
Camellia